1931 Estonian Football Championship was the 11th official football league season in Estonia. Six teams, four from Tallinn and two from Narva, took part in the league. VS Sport Tallinn won their seventh title.

League table

Results

Top scorers

References

Estonian Football Championship
1
Estonia
Estonia